Banjariya  is a village development committee in Parasi District in the Lumbini Zone of southern Nepal. At the time of the 1991 Nepal census it had a population of 5211 people living in 853 individual households.

References

Populated places in Parasi District